Ātene is a former village located  up the Whanganui River from Whanganui. Originally called Warepakoko, then Kakata, it was renamed by the missionary Richard Taylor in the 19th century as a Māori transliteration of Athens. It was the home of the hapū Ngāti Hineoneone of the iwi Te Āti Haunui-a-Pāpārangi. A small meeting house called Te Rangi-i-heke-iho, restored by carver Bill Ranginui, is all that remains.

The hill next to Ātene, Puketapu, was once on a peninsula almost completely surrounded by a meander of the Whanganui River; centuries ago the river broke through the neck of the peninsula, connecting the two bends and cutting off the meander. In the 1960s, a hydroelectric dam was proposed at Ātene, because the meander could have been reinstated while the dam was being constructed. A hydroelectric dam would have flooded the river as far back as Taumarunui, and the project was abandoned. While investigating the possibility of a dam, the Ministry of Works  built a road in 1959 along the ridgeline overlooking Puketapu. The road is now an 18 km walking track, the Ātene Skyline Track.

References

Geography of Manawatū-Whanganui
Whanganui River
Settlements on the Whanganui River